Punctelia osorioi is a species of foliose lichen in the family Parmeliaceae. It is found in Brazil.

Taxonomy
The lichen was described as a new species in 2010 by Brazilian lichenologists Luciana da Silva Canêz and Marcello Marcelli. The type specimen was collected in Rio Grande do Sul state, in the municipality of Vacaria. The specific epithet honours Uruguayan lichenologist Héctor Osorio, who, according to the authors, "contributed much to the development of our knowledge of lichenology in the Brazilian State of Rio Grande do Sul".

Description
The undersurface of the thallus is pale brown to white, with a smooth to wrinkled texture. There are rhizines densely packed around the margins; they are the same colour as the undersurface or white. The long ones are up to 1.65 mm long, while the shorter ones up to 0.95 mm. Sometimes the rhizines project beyond the margins of the thallus. The medulla produces caperatic acid.

Punctelia osorioi is somewhat similar in morphology to Punctelia bolliana, but can be distinguished from that species by its denser rhizines on the margins of the thallus underside, and its smooth or scalloped lobe margins, which are never lacinate (irregularly and finely slashed) like in P. bolliana.

Habitat and distribution
In addition to the type locality, Punctelia osorioi has also been recorded growing on trees in the trails of the Porto Alegre Botanical Garden in Porto Alegre.

References

osorioi
Lichen species
Lichens of South Brazil
Lichens described in 2010